Three ships of the Royal Navy have borne the name HMS Starfish, after the Starfish, a marine creature:

  was an  destroyer of the  subgroup. She was launched in 1894 and sold in 1911.
  was an  destroyer launched in 1916 and sold in 1928.
  was an S-class submarine launched in 1933 and lost in 1940.

Royal Navy ship names